Antennae is an album by the American jazz guitarist Joe Morris, recorded in 1997 and released on the AUM Fidelity label. It features a trio with Jerome Deupree, who was the original drummer in the rock band Morphine and played with Morris on some of his early Riti albums, and bassist Nate McBride. The pieces on Antennae took their inspiration from a collection of visual graphic aids created by Lowell Davidson, a pianist with whom Morris worked fairly extensively before his death in 1990.

Reception

The Penguin Guide to Jazz states: "The tracks on Antennae are among the most intense Morris has produced. He seems more inclined to dwell on notes and to explore the light and shade that gather between attack and delay." The DownBeat review by John Corbett thought that "Antennae is a rich trio outing from Morris, who continues to stretch jazz guitar into strange, beautiful new shapes."

Track listing
All compositions by Joe Morris
 "Synapse" – 8:17 
 "Antennae" – 13:21
 "Silent Treatment" – 7:35
 "Stare Into a Lightbulb for Three Years" – 13:30
 "Human Pyramid" – 9:22
 "Elevator" – 15:09
 "Virtual Whatever" – 6:45

Personnel
Joe Morris - guitar
 Nate McBride – bass
 Jerome Deupree – drums

References

1997 albums
Joe Morris (guitarist) albums
AUM Fidelity albums